Von Bethmann-Hollweg is  a German-language surname.  The name may refer to:
 Moritz August von Bethmann-Hollweg (1795–1877), German jurist and Prussian politician 
 Theobald von Bethmann Hollweg (1856–1921), German politician who was the Chancellor of the German Empire from 1909 to 1917 
Joachim Albrecht von Bethmann-Hollweg (1911–2001), German ice hockey player who competed for the German national team at the 1936 Winter Olympics in Garmisch-Partenkirchen, Bavaria, southern Germany
 Alexander von Bethmann-Hollweg (known as Alexander Hollweg; 1936–2020), English painter and sculptor
 Rebecca von Bethmann-Hollweg (known as Rebecca Hollweg; born 1964), English singer and songwriter

German-language surnames